The Three States Lumber Company Mill Powerhouse, also known as the Burdette Plantation Company Store, is a historic industrial site on Old Mill Road in Burdette, Arkansas.  The only surviving element of what was once a much larger sawmill, the powerhouse is a two-part structure built in 1909 to provide electrical power to the Three States Lumber Company.  The northern part of the building is a two-story brick structure with a gable roof, while the southern part is a single-story shed-roof concrete structure, which includes the remnants of a smokestack.  The Three States Lumber Company ran a large sawmill on this site between 1906 and 1922, removing most of the structures when its operations shut down.  The property was converted into a plantation when the company moved out, and this building became the company store.

The site was listed on the National Register of Historic Places in 2001.

See also
National Register of Historic Places listings in Mississippi County, Arkansas

References

Industrial buildings and structures on the National Register of Historic Places in Arkansas
Buildings designated early commercial in the National Register of Historic Places
Energy infrastructure completed in 1909
Company stores in the United States
National Register of Historic Places in Mississippi County, Arkansas
1909 establishments in Arkansas
Timber industry